Bowery Creek is a  tributary of Catskill Creek north of the Catskill Mountains of New York. Via Catskill Creek, it is part of the Hudson River watershed. Bowery Creek rises east of Windham High Peak in the northern part of the town of Cairo and flows northeast to Catskill Creek west of Freehold.

The name "Bowery" comes from the Dutch word for farm.

References

Rivers of New York (state)
Rivers of Greene County, New York
Tributaries of the Hudson River